{{DISPLAYTITLE:C6H10O4}}
The molecular formula C6H10O4 (molar mass: 146.14 g/mol, exact mass: 146.057909 u) may refer to:

 Aceburic acid
 Adipic acid
 Conduritol, a cyclitol or cyclic polyol
 Dianhydrohexitols
 Isoidide
 Isomannide
 Isosorbide
 Ethylidene diacetate
 Glucal

Molecular formulas